The 1946 Santa Clara Broncos football team was an American football team that represented Santa Clara University as an independent during the 1946 college football season. In their first season under head coach Len Casanova, the Broncos compiled a 2–5–1 record and were outscored by opponents by a combined total of 181 to 112.

Schedule

References

Santa Clara
Santa Clara Broncos football seasons
Santa Clara Broncos football